Grušova is a settlement east of Maribor in northeastern Slovenia. It belongs to the City Municipality of Maribor.

There is a small chapel with a belfry in the settlement. It is dedicated to the Holy Cross and was built in the late 19th century with a wooden altar dating to 1760.

References

External links
Grušova on Geopedia

Populated places in the City Municipality of Maribor